Park Hyun-ha (born 19 July 1989, Seoul) is a South Korean synchronized swimmer. She competed in the women's duet at the 2012 Summer Olympics with her sister Park Hyun-sun.

References

External links

1989 births
Living people
South Korean synchronized swimmers
Olympic synchronized swimmers of South Korea
Synchronized swimmers at the 2012 Summer Olympics
Asian Games medalists in artistic swimming
Artistic swimmers at the 2010 Asian Games
Medalists at the 2010 Asian Games
Asian Games bronze medalists for South Korea

People from Seoul